Woman Gone And Say Goodbye was the second ep released by Liverpool band The Stairs, the first being Weed Bus. The EP was issued in several formats: CD ep; 7" vinyl single with picture sleeve; 12" vinyl 45rpm single with picture sleeve; 12" 45rpm vinyl DJ promo single with a plain black sleeve. Both 12" vinyl single formats have What do you mean you don't smoke? inscribed in the matrix on Side A.

Songs
You Don't Love Me (You Don't Care) is a cover of a Bo Diddley song originally released in July 1959 on Checker Records album Go Bo Diddley. Russian Spy And I is also a cover, originally recorded by Dutch band The Hunters and released in 1966. The guitarist from The Hunters, Jan Akkerman, went on to form Brainbox in 1969 and, later, joined Focus.

UK 7" - Go!Disc 7" - GOD 70
Side A
 Woman Gone And Say Goodbye
 You Don't Love Me (You Don't Care)
Side B
 Russian Spy And I
 Yes It Is It's True

UK 12" - Go!Disc 12" - GODX 70
Side A
 Woman Gone And Say Goodbye
 You Don't Love Me (You Don't Care)
Side B
 Russian Spy And I
 Yes It Is It's True

UK CD - Go!Disc CDS - GODCD 70
 Woman Gone And Say Goodbye
 You Don't Love Me (You Don't Care)
 Russian Spy And I
 Yes It Is It's True

References 

The Stairs albums
1992 EPs